is a dam in Sera, Hiroshima Prefecture, Japan.

Description
The dam was built for the functional expansion of control facilities to quickly ascertain weather information and related matters, and confirm the safety of the river in discharge.  Furthermore, management was made more efficient to more accurately carry out dam control. It was necessary for dam control to continue its adequate control always paying attention to meteorological information, river flow rate, dam storage capacity, and related matters, at all times.

References

Dams in Hiroshima Prefecture
Dams completed in 1997